Parichthyodes samoana is a species of beetle in the family Cerambycidae, and the only species in the genus Parichthyodes. It was described by Breuning in 1959.

References

Apomecynini
Beetles described in 1959
Monotypic beetle genera